Diana (stylized on the cover as diana) is the eleventh studio album by American R&B singer Diana Ross, released on May 22, 1980, by Motown Records. The album is the best-selling studio album of Ross's career, spawning three international hit singles, including the number-one hit "Upside Down".

In 2020, Rolling Stone named Diana the 394th greatest album of all time.

Conception
Following the US success of her 1979 album The Boss, Ross wanted a fresher, more modern sound. Having heard Nile Rodgers of Chic's work in the famous Manhattan disco club Studio 54, Ross approached him about creating a new album of material for her that stated where she felt she was in her life and career at the period.

On an episode of TV One's Unsung, Nile Rodgers said that the majority of the songs were crafted after direct conversations with Ross. She had reportedly said to Rodgers and Bernard Edwards that she wanted to turn her career “upside down” and wanted to “have fun again.” As a result, Rodgers and Edwards wrote the songs "Upside Down" and "Have Fun (Again)". After running into several drag queens in a club dressed as Ross, Rodgers wrote "I'm Coming Out". Only "My Old Piano" came from their normal songwriting processes.

Initially, Ross was not pleased with the album's results. Following a preview of the record to be released in the aftermath of the anti-disco backlash, Frankie Crocker, an influential New York City disc jockey, warned Ross that releasing the album in its original state would even lead to the end of her career. Ross remixed the entire album, assisted by Motown engineer Russ Terrana, removing extended instrumental passages and speeding up the tracks' tempos. Ross also re-recorded all her lead vocals, and they were mixed so that they were front and center and not overshadowed by the music.

The remixing of the master tapes was performed without the knowledge or approval of Rodgers and Edwards. When they were presented with the "official" version of diana, the producers publicly objected and, at one point, even considered removing their names from the album's list of credits. Motown and Ross persisted, and the version released was Terrana's more commercial mix of the album.

Rodgers and Edwards were contracted by Motown to produce a follow-up album, but, as Ross left the label, it was never created. Rodgers and Edwards sued Motown, unsuccessfully claiming that they were owed monies for creating and recording the original version of the album. In 1989, Rodgers and Ross collaborated on Workin' Overtime (No. 3 US R&B), released upon Ross's return to Motown. Edwards produced the 1984 single, "Telephone" (No. 13 US R&B), from Ross' Swept Away album, released on the RCA label. Rodgers played guitar on the new wave song, "It's Your Move", from the same album.
 
The cover art was photographed by famed photographer Francesco Scavullo. For the shoot, she borrowed jeans from supermodel Gia Carangi.

Critical reception

Robert Christgau, writing for The Village Voice, gave the album an A- rating. He remarked that "not since Lady Sings the Blues has Ms. R. been forced into such a becoming straitjacket. Her perky angularity and fit-to-burst verve could have been designed for Rodgers & Edwards's synergy – you'd swear she was as great a singer as Alfa Anderson herself. And Nile is showing off more axemanship than any rhythm guitarist in history."

In a retrospecive review, Charity Stafford from AllMusic called the album "Ross' best solo record." She found that "Ross sounds more forceful than she had in years. The helium-toned style of her early hits with the Supremes is worlds away from the assertive way she rips into the funky hit "Upside Down." [...] The glossy Chic production might sound a bit dated to some ears, but it's matured much better than many similar albums of the era."

In her 2003 review of Dianas deluxe edition, Daryl Easlea from BBC Music wrote: "Diana is an artistic portrayal of complete freedom; Rodgers and Edwards' writing symbolises Ross' breaking free of the shackles of Motown on one level, but moreover, the work has a universality; celebrating gayness, blackness, equality; an album of challenging ideas, friendship and freedom."

Rolling Stone ranked the album No. 394 on its 2020 edition of the 500 Greatest Albums of All Time list.

Chart performance
Partly due to the controversy between Ross, Motown, and Nile Rodgers/Bernard Edwards, Motown released the album without a lead single. This was unheard of, especially for a label like Motown. However, by its 4th week leading into summer, the album was already nearing the top 10. "Upside Down" eventually was chosen by the label and radio programmers. "Upside Down" made a rare vaulted move in its third week from number 49 to number 10. By the middle of summer 1980, Ross chalked up her fifth number one single.

The album spent 17 weeks at the top of Billboards R&B/Dance chart. Reaching number two on the Billboard 200 chart and number one on the Billboard Soul Albums Chart for 8 consecutive weeks, as well as yielding two top 10 singles on the Billboard Hot 100, including the number-one single "Upside Down", the album would sell over one million copies in the United States and be certified Platinum by the Recording Industry Association of America (RIAA). In the UK it went Gold and spun off three successful singles; "Upside Down" (No. 2), "My Old Piano" (No. 5) and "I'm Coming Out" (No. 13). A fourth single, "Tenderness", was also released in certain territories, reaching the top 40 in the Netherlands, and was later included on several greatest hits compilations. Despite its massive dance and dance radio success, none of the singles from Diana were remixed for promotional and/or commercial use while the album was current.

"I'm Coming Out" has since become an anthem for the LGBT movement.

Some thirty years after its release, Diana remains Ross's best-selling studio album to date having sold a total of over 10 million copies worldwide, according to music critic Graham Reid.

Diana was one of four albums written and produced by Edwards and Rodgers in 1980, the other three being  Sister Sledge's Love Somebody Today, Sheila and B. Devotion's King of the World including European hit single "Spacer", and Chic's fourth studio album Real People.

Following the release of two more singles, the duet "Endless Love" with Lionel Richie and "It's My Turn", both worldwide hits, Ross left Motown and signed a then-record breaking $20 million recording deal with RCA Records. The first album for the label was 1981's self-produced Why Do Fools Fall in Love, which went platinum and spawned two Top 10 hits in the US. Diana was remastered and released as a double CD in 2003 containing the original Chic mixes and the Motown final mixes, unremixed versions, together with a selection of other Motown dance tracks from the same period.

Track listing
All songs written by Bernard Edwards and Nile Rodgers.

Original release

2001 (UK) / 2003 (US) deluxe edition

Personnel
Credits are adapted from the Diana liner notes.

Musicians

 Diana Ross – lead vocals
 Alfa Anderson – background vocals
 Fonzi Thornton – background vocals
 Luci Martin – background vocals
 Michelle Cobbs – background vocals
 Bernard Edwards – bass guitar
 Nile Rodgers – guitar
 Tony Thompson – drums
 Andy Barrett (Schwartz) – piano

 Raymond Jones – keyboards
 Eddie Daniels – saxophone
 Meco Monardo – trombone
 Bob Milliken – trumpet
 Valerie Haywood (The Chic Strings) – strings
 Cheryl Hong (The Chic Strings) – strings
 Karen Milne (The Chic Strings) – strings
 Gene Orloff – conductor

Production

 Bernard Edwards – producer for Chic Organization Ltd.
 Nile Rodgers – producer for Chic Organization Ltd.
 Bob Clearmountain – engineer proposed side A; tracks 1–4
 Bill Scheniman – engineer proposed side B; tracks 1–4
 James Farber – engineer
 Neil Dorfsman – engineer

 Ralph Osborn – engineer
 Abdoulaye Soumare – assistant engineer
 Jeff Hendrickson – assistant engineer
 Lucy Laurie – assistant engineer
 Peter Robbins – assistant engineer
 Dennis King – mastering

 All songs originally recorded at Power Station in New York. Lead vocal re-recordings: Electric Lady, New York; Motown/Hitsville U.S.A. Studios, Hollywood, California.
 All songs originally mixed at Power Station, New York. Remixed by Russ Terrana and Diana Ross at Artisan Sound Recorders, Hollywood, California.
 Mastered at Atlantic Studios, N.Y.

Charts

Weekly charts

Year-end charts

Certifications

See also
List of number-one R&B albums of 1980 (U.S.)

References

 Easlea, Daryl (2004). Everybody Dance: Chic and the Politics of Disco. London: Helter Skelter. 
 Chin, Brian (2003). Diana (Deluxe Edition) [Liner notes]. New York: Motown/Universal.
 Wangler, Petra. (May 5, 2000). Interview with Aretha Franklin. Musikbyrån. SVT Sweden.

External links
 

1980 albums
Albums produced by Bernard Edwards
Albums produced by Nile Rodgers
Diana Ross albums
Motown albums
Albums recorded at Electric Lady Studios